The Sunday Observance Act 1627 (3 Car 1 c 2) was an Act of the Parliament of England.

The words of commencement and the words "by any constable or churchwarden" were repealed by section 1 of, and Schedule 1 to, the Statute Law Revision Act 1948.

The words from "All which forfeitures" to "forfeiture" were repealed by section 46(2) of, and Part III of Schedule 7 to the Justices of the Peace Act 1949.

Section 3 of, and Schedule 3 to, the Statute Law Revision Act 1958 provided that 3 Car 1 c 2 was to cease to have effect in so far as it entitled persons to plead the general issue in civil proceedings, and that accordingly the second proviso was repealed.

The third proviso was repealed by section 87 of, and Schedule 5 to, the Ecclesiastical Jurisdiction Measure 1963 (No 1).

The whole Act, so far as unrepealed, was repealed by section 1 of, and Part IV of the Schedule to, the Statute Law (Repeals) Act 1969.

See also
Sunday Observance Act 1625

References
Halsbury's Statutes

External links
Wording of 1625 Sunday Observance Act

Acts of the Parliament of England
Sunday